Znachit, pora is the eleventh studio album by Russian singer Lyubov Uspenskaya released on 12 April 2019 by Cdland Contact.

Almost the entire album consists of previously released songs and new versions of the singer's old hits. Half of the songs on the album are duets with artists such as Emin Agalarov, Leonid Agutin, Kira Dymov and Dominik Joker. Also the song "Panda E", recorded as a duet with CYGO, was  included on the album.

Track listing

References

2019 albums
Lyubov Uspenskaya albums
Russian-language albums